John Coote may refer to:

John H. Coote, physiologist and autonomic neuroscience specialist
John Methuen Coote, British colonial administrator
John Coote (bookseller), 18th-century bookseller; see The Lady's Magazine

See also
John Cootes (born 1941), rugby league footballer and Roman Catholic priest